Elipsocus pusillus is a species of Psocoptera from the Elipsocidae family that is endemic to Azores.

References

Elipsocidae
Insects described in 1975
Endemic arthropods of the Azores
Psocoptera of Europe